Shubho Paul (Bengali: শুভ পাল; born 4 March 2004) is an Indian professional footballer who plays as a forward for I-League club Sudeva Delhi and the Indian U17 national team. He was part of the Bayern Munich U19 World Squad.

Career

Youth career

Sudeva Moonlight Academy
He played in the AIFF Youth League for Sudeva Academy. In the 2019–20 season he scored 14 goals in 11 games.

Senior career 
As a result of his stunning performance for the youth team he called up to the senior team of Sudeva Delhi for 2021 season. On 28 February 2021, he scored his maiden goal for senior team at 41 minute against TRAU FC though his team lost to the opponent by 3–2 down. He scored a decision making goal on 20 March 2021 to defeat Indian Arrows at 40th minute.

Bayern Munich World Squad
In 2021, Paul made it to German giant FC Bayern Munich's World Squad. The World squad included 15 international U19 talents from 15 different nations, who will be trained along with FC Bayern Munich U19 team.

International career 
He is part of Indian U20. In 2021,he playedfor the U16 team in the AFC U-16 Asian Cup Qualifier where he scored 3 goals in 3 matches. He scored a brace against Bahrain on 20 September 2019. He won 2019 SAFF U-15 Championship in which he scored 4 goals in 5 games for the U15 national side.

Career statistics

Club

Honours 
India U-15
U-15 SAFF Championship: 2019
India U-20
SAFF U-20 Championship: 2022

References 

2004 births
Living people
People from Howrah
Indian footballers
Footballers from West Bengal
Association football forwards
India youth international footballers
I-League players
Sudeva Delhi FC players